Holy Convent Higher Secondary School the sister concern college of Mother Teresa English School, Budaun. It was established in 1998 and is located at Madhuvan Colony Budaun, Uttar Pradesh. It runs higher secondary classes both in Hindi medium and English medium.

The Director of the School is Mr. Gopi Krishnan.

Affiliation
Holy Convent Higher Secondary School is affiliated through Board of High School and Intermediate Education, Uttar Pradesh.

High schools and secondary schools in Uttar Pradesh
Budaun
Educational institutions established in 1998
1998 establishments in Uttar Pradesh